Doug Jamison (born 30 October 1952) is a Canadian former swimmer. He competed in the men's 200 metre individual medley at the 1972 Summer Olympics at age 19, with a time of 2:17.71.

References

External links
 

1952 births
Living people
Olympic swimmers of Canada
Swimmers at the 1972 Summer Olympics
Swimmers from Edmonton
Canadian male medley swimmers
20th-century Canadian people
21st-century Canadian people